Virginia Water is a commuter village in the Borough of Runnymede in northern Surrey, England. It is home to the Wentworth Estate and the Wentworth Club. The area has much woodland and occupies a large minority of the Runnymede district. Its name is shared with the lake on its western boundary within Windsor Great Park. Virginia Water has excellent transport links with London–Trumps Green and Thorpe Green touch the M3, Thorpe touches the M25, and Heathrow Airport is seven miles to the north-east.

Many of the detached houses are on the Wentworth Estate, the home of the Wentworth Club which has four golf courses. The Ryder Cup was first played there. It is also home to the headquarters of the PGA European Tour, the professional golf tour. One of the houses featured in a headline in 1998—General Augusto Pinochet was placed under house arrest having unsuccessfully resisted extradition, the facing of a criminal trial in Chile.

In 2011 approximately half of the homes of the postcode district, which is narrower than the current electoral ward, were detached houses. In 2015 Land Registry sales data evinced Virginia Water's single postcode district as the most expensive as to the value of homes nationwide.

Etymology
The town is named after the nearby artificial Virginia Water Lake, which forms part of Windsor Great Park.

History
The Devil's Highway Roman Road, running from London, through Staines-upon-Thames (previously Pontes) to Silchester is thought to run through Virginia Water. Some of the local course has been lost, disappearing at the bottom of Prune Hill, and reappearing at the Leptis Magna ruins in the Great Park.

Nicholas Fuentes has argued that defeat of Boudica's insurrection by the Romans in AD 60/61 took place at Virginia Water, with the landscape between Callow Hill and Knowle Hill matching the battle landscape described by Tacitus, and the battle commencing roughly where the railway station lies.

The area was for centuries similar to the Strode or (also written) Stroude tything, one of four divisions of the very large "ancient" parish of Egham. Egham the Domesday survey valued at £40 per annum. Egham was in the original endowment of Chertsey Abbey in 666–75. The manor was included in all subsequent confirmations of the abbey land, and was held until the surrender of the abbey in 1537, since which time all its vestigial rights remained with the Crown, which thus sold much land piecemeal and controlled who could build major developments for centuries.

Christ Church, in the Church of England was completed in 1838 and established as a parish the same year.

The Duke of Wellington's brother-in-law lived at the 'Wentworths' house; this building now forms the Wentworth Club. In 1850, the house was bought by Ramón Cabrera, 1st Duke of Maestrazgo, an exiled Carlist general. During the Second World War, plans were put into place to move the government to the house, with tunnels dug underneath what is now the club carpark.

To the east of the lake is the Clockcase tower, a Grade I listed, triangular belvedere built in the Great Park during 1750s. It is three-storey Gothic style construction. George III made it into an observatory and Queen Victoria occasionally had tea there. The building is inaccessible to the public, lying within a private part of the park. It is still owned by the Royal Estate and when listed in 1984 used as a residence.

Virginia Park

Virginia Park is a gated housing development occupying the site of the former Holloway Sanatorium, a mental asylum constructed in 1885 to the design of William Henry Crossland. This was a private institution where patients paid for their own treatment. In 1948, it was taken over by the newly established National Health Service, and closed in 1980. 

After years of neglect, in 2000 the building and grounds were converted into private sector housing by a developer, Octagon. Octagon produced 23 residences in the main building and built 190 new houses and apartments on the grounds. Properties on the estate are highly expensive and typically reach beyond the £1 million mark.

The main building is Grade I listed, the highest category of recognition and protection.  The sanatorium chapel is Grade II* listed, meaning in a constrained mid-tier of the statutory scheme. The gated estate includes a spa, gymnasium, multi-purpose sports hall, and all-weather tennis court.

Wentworth Estate

 of Virginia Water is owned by a members' trustee body, known as the Wentworth Estate. Founded in the 1920s, this estate comprises private sector houses, luxury apartments, woodland, several golf courses and a leisure club. It also includes part of the River Bourne, Chertsey.

The estate, due to its high walls and electric gates, has been compared to a "fortified suburb" found more commonly in South Africa and a place "where money disappears from view". Famous residents have included Elton John, Bruce Forsyth, Diana Dors and various professional golfers. Properties on the estate are regarded as "super prime" and have sold for as much as £50 million.

Geography

Physical geography
The River Bourne runs from the artificial Virginia Water Lake through the long southern half of Virginia Water.

Housing and socio-economic geography
The 2011 census stated that the Virginia Water postcode district (post town) had the following dwellings, thus making up the relative proportions shown:

Government data in terms of sales of homes from Autumn 2014 to 2015 showed Virginia Water to be the most expensive post town nationally (i.e. excluding any part of London). The recent averaged sold price for its homes was just over £1.1m.

Transport
The town has a junction railway station, built after the first line opened in 1856 to Ascot. Frequent South Western Railway trains run to London Waterloo, Weybridge, Twickenham, Richmond, Staines, Feltham, Clapham Junction, Vauxhall and Reading.

Education

Christ Church school was built by the National Society in 1843 on land given by Saint George Francis Caulfeild of The Wentworths.  He attempted to bind the land with "all buildings thereon erected or to be erected to be forever hereafter appropriated and used as land for a School for the Education of Children and Adults or Children only of labouring manufacturing and other poorer classes". The school was built for £716. 16 7. In 2020, due to loss of intake, Surrey County Council set underway closure, moving attendees to consolidated Englefield Green Infant School by 2023.

St Ann's Heath Junior School is on Sandhills Lane.

Trumps Green Infant School is on Crown Road in the south of the ward and the postcode district (the only of post town in this case).

Notable people

 Susie Amy - Actress
 Petr Aven - Russian oligarch, banker and art collector, sanctioned during the 2022 Russian invasion of Ukraine, owner of Ingliston House in the Wentworth Estate 
 Kairat Boranbayev - Kazakhstani oligarch, senior football administrator in the Kazakhstan Premier League, arrested in Kazakhstan on suspicion of embezzling state funds
 Bill Bryson - writer, resident in the early 1980s
 Ramón Cabrera, 1st Duke of Maestrazgo—exiled Carlist Spanish general and owner of the Wentworth Estate; buried with widow in a Grade II listed tomb by the Anglican church, died 1877
 Ron Dennis—Executive and investor, founder of the McLaren Group
 Diana Dors—Actress, some years, between other homes, until her death in 1984
 Sir Nick Faldo—Golfer
 Bryan Forbes—Film director, screenwriter, film producer, actor and novelist, until his death in 2013
 Sir Bruce Forsyth—Television presenter, some years until his death in 2017
 Kirsty Gallacher — Television presenter 
 Marina Granovskaia - Russian-Canadian business executive, director of Chelsea F.C.
 Naseem Hamed — Boxer 
 Ted Heath - Band leader, died there 1969.
 Elton John—Composer and music performer, some years until 2000.
 Eddie Jordan - Racing driver, TV presenter and owner of the Jordan Grand Prix F1 racing team.
 German Khan - Ukrainian oligarch, "a close associate of Vladimir Putin who has been involved in destabilising Ukraine", sanctioned during the 2022 Russian invasion of Ukraine
 Gulnara Karimova - Uzbek kleptocrat and daughter of Islam Karimov, former-president of Uzbekistan. Acquired hundreds of millions of dollars through bribery, convicted by Uzbek court in "one of the largest bribery and corruption cases of all time". Resident of the Wentworth estate.
 Dmitry Leus - Russian exile, former head of Russian Depository Bank and conservative party donor and chair of Runnymede conservative association. Imprisoned in Russia for dealing with money laundered funds  and has been described as being "absolutely dependent" on the Russian security services.
 Lady Wilnelia Merced - model and Miss World 1975
 Vaslav Nijinsky—Ballet dancer and choreographer, from 1947 for three years (until his death)
 Alexander Perepilichny - Russian businessman and whistleblower
 Kevin Pietersen—Cricketer
 Augusto Pinochet— Dictator of Chile, lived in exile at Everglades in the Wentworth Estate died 2006 in Chile.
 Cliff Richard—Singer songwriter 
 Andriy Shevchenko - Ukrainian footballer
 Chris Squire—Bassist, died 2015 in Arizona
 James Stunt—socialite and businessman
 Bernie Taupin—Lyricist
 Jessica Taylor-singer, television personality and dancer who was a member of the pop group Liberty X 
 Joe Wicks - Celebrity fitness coach lived in village as a child

References

External links

 
Borough of Runnymede
Windsor Great Park